is a Japanese judoka.

Yamashita is from Takayama, Gifu and began judo when she was in second grade. After graduating from Tohwa University, she began working for the Osaka Prefectural Police. There she defeated Christine Cicot by Osotogari to win a bronze medal.

Yamashita retired after the  competition in 2003.

Achievements
1997 - All-Japan Championships (Openweight only) 3rd
 - All-Japan University Championships (Openweight only) 2nd
 - All-Japan University Weight Class Championships (+78 kg) 3rd
1998 - All-Japan Weight Class Championships (+78 kg) 2nd
1999 - Fukuoka International Championships (+78 kg) 1st
 - Universiade (Openweight) 2nd
2000 - Olympic Games (+78 kg) 3rd
 - Asian Championships (+78 kg) 3rd
 - Fukuoka International Championships (+78 kg) 3rd
 - All-Japan Championships (Openweight only) 1st
 - All-Japan Weight Class Championships (+78 kg) 1st
2001 - East Asian Games (Openweight) 2nd
 - Fukuoka International Championships (+78 kg) 3rd
 - All-Japan Championships (Openweight only) 2nd
 - All-Japan Weight Class Championships (+78 kg) 2nd
2002 - All-Japan Weight Class Championships (+78 kg) 2nd

References

External links
 
 
 

Japanese female judoka
Sportspeople from Gifu Prefecture
1975 births
Living people
Judoka at the 2000 Summer Olympics
Olympic judoka of Japan
Olympic bronze medalists for Japan
Olympic medalists in judo
Medalists at the 2000 Summer Olympics
Universiade medalists in judo
Universiade silver medalists for Japan
Medalists at the 1999 Summer Universiade